SRX246, also known as API-246, is a small-molecule, centrally-active, highly-selective vasopressin V1A receptor antagonist which is under investigation by Azevan Pharmaceuticals for the treatment of affective and anger disorders. It is an azetidinone derivative, and was developed from LY-307174 as a lead compound. A phase II activity trial of the drug in the treatment of adults with intermittent explosive disorder is ongoing. It is also being studied for the treatment of post-traumatic stress disorder.

See also 
 List of investigational anxiolytics
 ABT-436
 Balovaptan
 Nelivaptan
 TS-121

References

External links 
 Azevan Pharmaceuticals, Inc. - Clinical Candidates
 SRX-246 - AdisInsight

Lactams
Oxazolidines
Piperidines
Vasopressin receptor antagonists